Amy Pieters (born 1 June 1991) is a Dutch professional road and track cyclist, who is contracted to ride for UCI Women's WorldTeam . She was a member of the Dutch team that finished sixth at the 2012 Summer Olympics in the team pursuit (together with Ellen van Dijk, Kirsten Wild and Vera Koedooder).

On 23 December 2021, Pieters was placed in an induced coma and underwent emergency surgery to relieve pressure on her brain caused by a fall that day during a training ride near Alicante with the Dutch national track team. After being repatriated to the Netherlands the following month, Pieters had regained consciousness in April but, due to the brain injury suffered, doctors were unsure of her "residual symptoms and remaining abilities". In October 2022, Pieters was able to take her first steps since the fall, at a neuro-rehabilitation centre in Woerden.

Personal life
Pieters is the daughter of former professional Peter Pieters, the niece of Sjaak Pieters and the sister of Roy Pieters.

Career achievements

Major results
Source:

Road

2006
 National Novices Road Championships
1st  Time trial
2nd Road race
2007
 National Novices Road Championships
1st  Road race
2nd Time trial
2008
 National Junior Road Championships
2nd Road race
2nd Time trial
 4th Time trial, UCI Junior World Championships
2009
 2nd Time trial, National Junior Road Championships
 3rd Overall Omloop van Borsele
2010
 1st Draai rond de Kraai
 2nd Twee Bruggenronde van Zaandam
 3rd Ronde van Barendrecht
2011
 1st Twee Bruggenronde van Zaandam
 1st Berkelse Wielerdag
 1st Ronde van Zwanenburg
 2nd Molenomloop van de Schermer
 2nd Afwachtingswedstrijd Olympia's Tour
 2nd Van Gogh Ronde van Nuenen
 3rd Gooik–Geraardsbergen–Gooik
 3rd Draai rond de Kraai
 3rd Noordwijk Classic
 3rd Profronde van Oostvoorne
 6th Overall Thüringen Rundfahrt der Frauen
1st Young rider classification
 7th Omloop van Borsele
 8th Omloop van het Hageland
 9th Overall Ster Zeeuwsche Eilanden
2012
 1st Afwachtingswedstrijd Olympia's Tour
 1st Wielerronde van Lekkerkerk
 1st Young rider classification Energiewacht Tour
 2nd Regio Kampioenschap West
 2nd Noordwijk Classic
 3rd Overall Ster Zeeuwsche Eilanden
 5th EPZ Omloop van Borsele
 6th Road race, UEC European Under-23 Road Championships
2013
 1st Regio Kampioenschap West
 1st Noordwijk Classic
 1st Profronde van Stiphout
 2nd Omloop der Kempen
 2nd Acht van Chaam
 2nd Profronde van Surhuisterveen
 3rd Tour of Chongming Island World Cup
 3rd Open de Suède Vårgårda
 3rd Wielerronde van Obdam
 4th 7-Dorpenomloop Aalburg
 6th Overall Belgium Tour
1st  Young rider classification
 9th Overall Tour of Chongming Island
2014
 1st Omloop Het Nieuwsblad
 2nd Overall Tour of Qatar
1st  Young rider classification
1st Stage 2
 2nd Open de Suède Vårgårda
 3rd Holland Hills Classic
 4th Overall BeNe Ladies Tour
 5th Overall Belgium Tour
 6th Overall The Women's Tour
 6th Drentse 8 van Dwingeloo
 7th Le Samyn
 8th Overall Festival Luxembourgeois du cyclisme féminin Elsy Jacobs
 9th Ronde van Drenthe World Cup
 10th Gooik–Geraardsbergen–Gooik
2015
 1st Dwars door Vlaanderen
 1st Prologue La Route de France
 2nd Road race, National Road Championships
 2nd Ronde van Drenthe World Cup
 3rd Marianne Vos Classic
 3rd La Course by Le Tour de France
 4th Novilon EDR Cup
 4th Gooik–Geraardsbergen–Gooik
 5th Gent–Wevelgem
 6th Overall Belgium Tour
 6th Crescent Women World Cup Vårgårda
 7th Overall Holland Ladies Tour
 7th Omloop Het Nieuwsblad
 7th Le Samyn des Dames
 8th Omloop van het Hageland
 9th Overall Tour of Qatar
 9th Overall Thüringen Rundfahrt der Frauen
 9th Holland Hills Classic
 10th Overall Festival Luxembourgeois du cyclisme féminin Elsy Jacobs
 10th Acht van Westerveld
2016
 1st Prologue La Route de France
 3rd Le Samyn
 4th Gent–Wevelgem
 4th Crescent Vårgårda UCI Women's WorldTour
 5th Overall Energiewacht Tour
 6th Overall Tour of Qatar
 6th Overall Holland Ladies Tour
 7th Overall The Women's Tour
1st Stage 2
 7th Gooik–Geraardsbergen–Gooik
 10th Omloop van de IJsseldelta
2017
 1st Crescent Vårgårda UCI Women's WorldTour TTT
 1st Stage 2 The Women's Tour
 2nd  Team time trial, UCI Road World Championships
 2nd Le Samyn
 4th Tour de Yorkshire
 6th Overall Healthy Ageing Tour
1st Stages 1b & 2 (TTT)
 7th Pajot Hills Classic
 7th Amstel Gold Race
 9th Overall Thüringen Rundfahrt
 9th Overall Holland Ladies Tour
1st  Combativity classification, Prologue
2018
 1st  Overall Healthy Ageing Tour
1st Stages 2 & 3b (TTT)
 1st Ronde van Drenthe
 1st Crescent Vårgårda TTT
 1st GP de Plouay – Bretagne
 1st Stage 3 Emakumeen Euskal Bira
 UCI Road World Championships
2nd  Team time trial
8th Road race
 2nd Road race, National Road Championships
 2nd Dwars door Vlaanderen
 2nd Tour of Flanders for Women
 5th Overall The Women's Tour
 5th Gent–Wevelgem
 8th Overall Holland Ladies Tour
2019
 1st  Mixed team relay, UCI Road World Championships
 UEC European Road Championships
1st  Road race
1st  Mixed team relay
 2nd Overall BeNe Ladies Tour
 2nd Drentse Acht van Westerveld
 3rd Road race, National Road Championships
 3rd Overall The Women's Tour
1st Stage 6
 3rd GP de Plouay – Bretagne
 4th Overall Healthy Ageing Tour
 4th Ronde van Drenthe
 4th Nokere Koerse
 5th Overall Holland Ladies Tour
 5th Gent–Wevelgem
 5th Durango-Durango Emakumeen Saria
 5th Postnord UCI WWT Vårgårda West Sweden
 10th Tour of Flanders
2020
 2nd Tour of Flanders
 5th Liège–Bastogne–Liège
 9th Gent–Wevelgem
 10th Road race, UEC European Road Championships
2021
 1st  Road race, National Road Championships
 1st Nokere Koerse
 3rd  Mixed team relay, UEC European Road Championships
 3rd Omloop Het Nieuwsblad
 4th Overall The Women's Tour
1st Stage 2 
 5th Overall Healthy Ageing Tour
1st  Points classification
 6th Overall Thüringen Ladies Tour
 6th Le Samyn
 6th Dwars door de Westhoek
 7th Overall Holland Ladies Tour
 9th Classic Brugge–De Panne

Track

2006
 1st  Omnium, National Novice Championships
2007
 National Junior Championships
1st  500m time trial
1st  Individual pursuit
1st  Keirin
1st  Points race
2nd Scratch
2008
 National Junior Championships
1st  500m time trial
1st  Individual pursuit
1st  Keirin
1st  Points race
1st  Scratch
 3rd  Points race, UEC European Junior Championships
 3rd Omloop van Borsele
 3rd Six Days of Amsterdam
2009
 2nd  Team pursuit, 2008–09 UCI Track Cycling World Cup Classics, Copenhagen (with Vera Koedooder & Ellen van Dijk)
 3rd Individual pursuit, National Championships
 4th Team pursuit, UCI World Championships (with Vera Koedooder & Ellen van Dijk)
2010
 National Championships
1st  Madison (with Roxane Knetemann)
2nd Points race)
 5th Team pursuit, UCI World Championships (with Vera Koedooder & Ellen van Dijk)
 9th Team pursuit, UEC European Championships (with Ellen van Dijk & Laura van der Kamp)
2011
 1st  Team pursuit, 2011–12 UCI Track Cycling World Cup, Astana (with Kirsten Wild & Ellen van Dijk)
 National Championships
2nd Points race
2nd Madison (with Kelly Markus)
3rd Individual pursuit
2012
 1st  Individual pursuit, UEC European Under-23 Championships
 National Championships
2nd Individual pursuit
2nd Omnium
3rd Madison (with Kelly Markus)
3rd Scratch
 6th Team pursuit, Olympic Games (with Ellen van Dijk & Kirsten Wild)
2014
 2nd Points race, Revolution – Round 3, Manchester
2015
 1st  Scratch, National Championships
2017
 1st  Individual pursuit, National Championships
 1st Madison, Zesdaagse Vlaanderen-Gent (with Kirsten Wild)
 3rd  Madison, UEC European Championships (with Kirsten Wild)
2018
 National Championships
1st  Individual pursuit
2nd Points race
 2nd  Madison, UCI World Championships (with Kirsten Wild)
 3rd  Madison, UEC European Championships (with Kirsten Wild)
2019
 1st  Madison, UCI World Championships (with Kirsten Wild)
 3rd  Madison, UEC European Championships (with Kirsten Wild)
2020
 1st  Madison, UCI World Championships (with Kirsten Wild)
2021
 1st  Madison, UCI World Championships (with Kirsten Wild)

National team pursuit records

After the introduction of the women's 3000m team pursuit at the 2007–08 track cycling season, Pieters was five times part of the team pursuit squad when they established a new Dutch national record. She is not the record holder anymore.

See also
List of Dutch Olympic cyclists

References

External links
 
 
 
 
 
 
 
 

1991 births
Living people
Dutch female cyclists
Dutch track cyclists
Sportspeople from Haarlem
Cyclists at the 2012 Summer Olympics
Olympic cyclists of the Netherlands
UCI Road World Championships cyclists for the Netherlands
Dutch cyclists at the UCI Track Cycling World Championships
European Games competitors for the Netherlands
Cyclists at the 2015 European Games
UCI Track Cycling World Champions (women)
Cyclists at the 2019 European Games
Cyclists at the 2020 Summer Olympics
Cyclists from North Holland
20th-century Dutch women
21st-century Dutch women
UCI Road World Champions (women)